Protocol is the début album/EP from drummer/percussionist Simon Phillips.  It was released in 1988 on the Music for Nations label, a company which had, at one time, bands such as Metallica and Slayer.

Of the release, Phillips calls it "a record of experimental observations" and goes on to say "It was a good feeling to have finally released my first solo CD, and although not what I had originally planned, it was a start to my solo career."

Track listing

Personnel
Simon Phillips – drums, percussion, guitar, bass, keyboards, sequencer

Production
Arranged and produced by Simon Phillips
Recorded, engineered and mixed by Steve Parker
Mastered by Tim Young

References

Simon Phillips (drummer) albums
1988 debut EPs